The Peugeot RC is a concept car built by French automaker Peugeot and introduced at the 2002 Geneva Motor Show.

Design
The RC was a mid-engined, rear-wheel drive sports car shown in two versions. The "Spade" was painted black and featured a 2.0L naturally aspirated inline-four petrol engine. Power was quoted at 181 bhp (133.2 kW). The red "Diamond" was powered by a 2.2L diesel engine that was capable of the same performance but with different driving and ride characteristics. Both variants were equipped with a six-speed sequential gearbox, featured a  carbon-fiber body, ceramic disc brakes, and a 0-60 mph (0–97 km/h) time of 6.0 seconds.

Reception
The bodywork, designed by Peugeot Style Centre, was praised as graceful and imaginative, and has influenced subsequent Peugeot cars.  The diesel Diamond was quoted as capable of a fuel economy of 57 mpg (4.1 L/100 km), a very impressive figure for any car with sporting ambitions.  The television show BBC Top Gear, not known for its love of diesels, reviewed the Peugeot RC Diamond in 2002 and presenter Richard Hammond remarked that it was "possibly the first proper diesel sports car."

Hybrid electric

Peugeot has presented in the Paris Motor Show a new concept hybrid electric sports sedan. Similar to the drivetrain model used in the Chevy Volt, the 2009 Peugeot RC concept promises the ability to run solely off electric power for extended periods, with a hybrid electric powertrain filling in the gaps when extra range is needed

The Peugeot RC HYmotion4 includes a  electric motor at the front wheels
.

References

External links

Specifications and images
Comparison of diesel and petrol versions
Top Gear episode archive
Official site of Peugeot Style Centre

RC
Sports cars
Concept cars
Plug-in hybrid vehicles